Suparibağ (also, Suparibag) is a village and municipality in the Astara Rayon of Azerbaijan.  It has a population of 1,052.

References 

Populated places in Astara District